Salt Springs  is a small community in the Canadian province of Nova Scotia, in Antigonish County.

References
Salt Springs on Destination Nova Scotia

Communities in Antigonish County, Nova Scotia
General Service Areas in Nova Scotia